Lamprocystis hornbosteli is a species of small air-breathing land snails, terrestrial pulmonate gastropod mollusks in the family Euconulidae, the hive snails.

This species is endemic to Northern Mariana Islands.

References

Lamprocystis
Fauna of the Northern Mariana Islands
Taxonomy articles created by Polbot